For a complete list see :Category:Football clubs in the Comoros

A
AJSM de Mutsamudu (Mutsamudu)
Apache (Mitsamiouli)
ASIM Itsandra (Ngazidja)

C
Chirazienne FC
Coin Nord (Mitsamiouli)

D
Djabal Club

E
Élan Club (Mitsoudjé)
ESM de M'Djoiezi
Étoile des Comores (Nyoumadzaha Bambao)
Etoile d'Or
Étoile du Sud
Étoile Polaire (Nioumamilima)

F
Fomboni FC (Fomboni)

G
Gombessa Sport

H
Hairu FC (Ngazidja)

J
JACM de Mitsoudjé

K
Komorozine de Domoni

N
Ngaya Club (Mdé)
Ngazi Sports (Mirontsy)

S
Steal Nouvel FC (Sima)

U
US de Séléa
US de Ntsaoueni
US de Zilimadjou

V
Volcan Club (Moroni)

Comoros
 
Football clubs
Football clubs